Luciano Bergamin CRL (born 4 May 1944 in Loria, Veneto) is an Italian clergyman and Roman Catholic Bishop of Nova Iguaçu in Brazil.

Life
On 19 December 1982 Luciano Bergamin joined the community of the Canons Regular of the Lateran, took up the profession on 2 October 1960 and received the priestly ordination on 10 April 1969.

Pope John Paul II appointed him on 5 April 2000 as auxiliary bishop in Santo Amaro and titular bishop of Octabia. The bishop gave him the bishop of Santo Amaro, to Fernando Antônio Figueiredo, on 20 May that year.  Co-consecrators were Emílio Pignoli, Bishop of Campo Limpo, and Francisco Manuel Vieira, Bishop of Osasco. He chose DOMINUS LUX ET SALUS as his motto.

On 24 July 2002 he was appointed Bishop of Nova Iguaçu.

References

1944 births
Living people
21st-century Roman Catholic bishops in Brazil
Roman Catholic bishops of Santo Amaro